Petra in Aegypto (also spelled Petra in Ægypto) was a Hellenistic city and former bishopric in Roman Egypt and remains a Latin Catholic titular see.

History 
Petra in Aegypto, identified with modern Hagar-En-Nauatiyeh, was important enough in the Roman province of Aegyptus Primus (civil Diocese of Egypt), to become a suffragan of the Patriarchate of Alexandria, but faded, presumably at the advent of Islam.

Little is known not even a single historically documented bishop, as it isn't mentioned in classical reference works like Lequien's Oriens Christianus.

Titular see 
The diocese was nominally restored in 1933 as Latin Titular bishopric of Petra in Ægypto (Latin) / Petra di Egitto (Curiate Italian) / Petren(sis) in Æypto (Latin adjective).

It remains vacant, without a single incumbent. It is of the Episcopal (lowest) rank.

See also 
 List of Catholic dioceses in Egypt

Sources and external links 
 GCatholic

Catholic titular sees in Africa
Former Roman Catholic dioceses in Africa
Suppressed Roman Catholic dioceses